Tal-e Reis (also Romanized as Tal-e Re’īs, Tol Ra’īs, and Tol-e Ra’īs; also known as Tolombeh-ye Ra’īsī) is a village in Howmeh Rural District, in the Central District of Deyr County, Bushehr Province, Iran. At the 2006 census, its population was 48, in 9 families.

References 

Populated places in Deyr County